Pseudopostega fumida is a moth of the family Opostegidae. It is only known from secondary, tropical forest in central Belize.

The length of the forewings is about 2.1 mm. Adults are glossy gray with a largely white head. Adults have been collected in April.

Etymology
The specific name is derived from the Latin fumida (smoked-colored, darkened), as suggested by the unusual dark color of the moth.

External links
A Revision of the New World Plant-Mining Moths of the Family Opostegidae (Lepidoptera: Nepticuloidea)

Opostegidae
Moths described in 2007